Mooers, formerly Mooers-upon-the-Chazy, is a hamlet and census-designated place in the town of Mooers, in Clinton County, New York, United States. The population was 442 at the 2010 census, out of a total population of 3,592 in the town. It was once an incorporated village, but dissolved in 1994.

Mooers is in northern New York state, near the Canada–United States border with the Canadian province of Quebec.

Geography
The community is at the junction of U.S. Route 11 and New York State Route 22 on the north side of the Great Chazy River. US-11 leads east  to Interstate 87 at the village of Champlain and west  to Chateaugay, while NY-22 leads south  to Plattsburgh, the county seat.

Demographics

As of the census of 2000, there were 440 people, 184 households, and 126 families residing in the CDP. The population density was 370.9 per square mile (142.8/km2). There were 212 housing units at an average density of 178.7/sq mi (68.8/km2). The racial makeup of the CDP was 98.18% White, 0.23% Black or African American, 0.23% Native American, 0.23% Asian, 0.45% from other races, and 0.68% from two or more races. Hispanic or Latino of any race were 1.14% of the population.

There were 184 households, out of which 30.4% had children under the age of 18 living with them, 51.6% were married couples living together, 12.0% had a female householder with no husband present, and 31.5% were non-families. 28.8% of all households were made up of individuals, and 17.9% had someone living alone who was 65 years of age or older. The average household size was 2.39 and the average family size was 2.88.

In the CDP, the population was spread out, with 23.9% under the age of 18, 7.5% from 18 to 24, 25.2% from 25 to 44, 23.4% from 45 to 64, and 20.0% who were 65 years of age or older. The median age was 41 years. For every 100 females, there were 100.9 males. For every 100 females age 18 and over, there were 91.4 males.

The median income for a household in the CDP was $25,250, and the median income for a family was $30,817. Males had a median income of $31,071 versus $16,767 for females. The per capita income for the CDP was $14,324. About 11.1% of families and 19.2% of the population were below the poverty line, including 43.0% of those under age 18 and none of those age 65 or over.

References

Census-designated places in New York (state)
Hamlets in New York (state)
Former villages in New York (state)
Census-designated places in Clinton County, New York
Populated places disestablished in 1994
Hamlets in Clinton County, New York